The 2014 Missouri State Bears football team represented Missouri State University in the 2014 NCAA Division I FCS football season. They were led by ninth-year head coach Terry Allen and played their home games at the Plaster Sports Complex. They were a member of the Missouri Valley Football Conference. They finished the season 4–8, 1–7 in MVFC play to finish in ninth place.

Head coach Terry Allen retired from coaching following the last game of the season.

Schedule

Ranking movements

References

Missouri State
Missouri State Bears football seasons
Missouri State Bears football